Mullah Sher Mohammad Malang was a Taliban governor of Nimruz Province, Afghanistan under the Taliban government. He is a Popalzai. After the Taliban took control in the south in the mid-1990s, he was appointed governor of Nimruz and then later served with the military.

Malang is remembered by locals for burning a local library, beating people with a stick, and believing the local people to be Shi'a (and thus heretics per Taliban belief) due to their proximity to Iran.

References

Governors of Nimruz Province
Taliban governors
Living people
Pashtun people
Year of birth missing (living people)